Autopilot Off is the first major label EP by the punk band Autopilot Off. It is the band's first release with the label Island Records and was produced by the then Sum 41 manager and producer Greig Nori. This was the first album by the band to feature their symbol - the split-in-half padlock - on the album cover art, which would then go on to feature on all of their future-album's cover art.

Track listing
 "Long Way to Fall"	-	02:39
 "Indebted"		-	02:29
 "Nothing Frequency"	-	02:39
 "Exit Signs"		-	02:43
 "Wide Awake"		-	03:12

References

Autopilot Off albums
2002 EPs
Albums produced by Greig Nori
Island Records EPs